Bahadur Shah may refer to:
Bahadur Shah of Gujarat (died 1537)
Bahadur Shah I (1643–1712), Mughal Emperor
Bahadur Shah II (1775–1862), the last Mughal Emperor and final ruler of the Timurid house
Bahadur Nizam Shah, ruler of the Ahmadnagar Sultanate from 1596 to 1600
Bahadur Shah, last ruler of Khandesh Sultanate
Bahadur Shah of Nepal, second son of Prithvi Narayan Shah, regent of his minor nephew king of Nepal and de facto ruler of Nepal until 1794